Ballistic: Ecks vs. Sever is a 2002 action thriller film directed by Wych Kaosayananda (under the pseudonym of Kaos). The film stars Antonio Banderas and Lucy Liu as opposing secret agents who team up to fight a common enemy. It is an international co-production among Canada, Germany and the United States.

Ballistic was universally panned by critics and has been frequently described as one of the worst films ever made. Grossing just $20 million against a $70 million budget, the film was also a box-office bomb. With a total of 119 reviews, the most for a film with a 0% approval rating, Ballistic: Ecks vs. Sever is the worst-reviewed film in the history of Rotten Tomatoes.

Plot
Returning home with his mother Vin from a trip to Berlin, Michael Gant, the son of Defense Intelligence Agency (DIA) director Robert Gant, is kidnapped and his security detail is nearly wiped out by the attacker, ex-DIA agent Sever. FBI agent Jeremiah Ecks left the agency after his wife Rayne was killed in a car bombing. His old boss, Julio Martin, asks him to investigate the Gant case. He claims that Rayne is still alive and he will give Ecks the information on her whereabouts if he helps take down Sever. Ecks agrees and discovers Sever is an orphaned Chinese girl the DIA adopted to train as a covert operative and assassin with "no fear, no conscience, and no morality." Meanwhile, Robert Gant executes the only survivor of his son's security detail. He then orders his elite agents, led by A. J. Ross, to pursue Sever and rescue Michael.

Ecks joins Martin and CSIS agent Harry Lee in Vancouver, where Sever is hiding out. Ecks learns that Gant stole an experimental weapon codenamed Softkill, a nanorobot which operates in the human circulatory system and can cause heart attacks at will. Gant had implanted Softkill in Michael in order to smuggle it into the United States. Ross and his men surround Sever in a shopping plaza, but she wipes out Ross's forces in a lengthy gun battle. Sever shoots Martin, and Ecks pursues Sever, climaxing with a fight that's cut off when Ross starts shooting at them with an M60 machine gun, giving Sever a chance to escape.

Ecks is arrested by the Vancouver Police Department under the false pretense that he killed Martin. While being transported to jail, his convoy is attacked by Sever, who frees Ecks. After a lengthy car chase, Sever throws a piece of paper at Ecks and tells him to ask Gant about his wife. Ecks meets Rayne at an aquarium and it's revealed that her "death" was orchestrated by Gant. Rayne ended up believing Ecks had died while he thought she was gone. Rayne then married Gant under the name Vinn. It ends up that Gant had Sever's family killed; it was initially believed that kidnapping Michael was Sever's revenge. However, Rayne reveals that Michael is actually Ecks' son, and Sever's kidnapping was for his protection.

Ecks, Rayne, and Sever go to Sever's underground bunker in an abandoned trainyard, where Rayne is reunited with Michael. Gant and Ross arrive with an army of heavily armed DIA agents, and a massive battle ensues. Ecks and Sever eventually gain the upper hand and Sever kills Ross in a fight in the bunker. Gant tries to retrieve the Softkill in Michael's arm but is surprised to find it's not there. Sever kills Gant using a Softkill-loaded bullet and escapes as the police arrive. The film concludes with Ecks and Sever looking over the sea and Ecks thanking Sever for reuniting him with his family.

Cast

Production 
Around 1986 screenwriter Alan B. McElroy wrote a spec script titled Legion, which McElroy said was an action thriller about ex L.A. cop who's called in to help track down a rogue CIA agent code-named Legion who went on a killing spree. After he and director Dwight H. Little made Halloween 4: The Return of Michael Myers (1988), the next movie they wanted to do was Legion, which by then was re-titled into Gunner, the name of the main hero character in the script. Between 1988 and 1989 they worked on the project at Vestron Pictures, and Dolph Lundgren was going to star in the film, however, due to management changes in Vestron, producer Charles W. Fries stopped the development of the film. McElroy's script was left unproduced until about 1999 when it was picked up for production again, but this time with the new title, Ecks vs. Sever. Originally the film was intended to star Wesley Snipes and Jet Li, and then after them Sylvester Stallone and Vin Diesel were going to star. After the director and cast were finally chosen in pre-production, McElroy's script was completely re-written by Peter M. Lenkov. The main reasons for re-writes included way too big and expensive action sequences, a wish for a more serious, darker, and grittier tone, and the story of McElroy's original script focusing more on themes of family love and loss and revenge. The entire subplot about nanotechnology was one of the things which were added to make the film more like The Matrix (1999). Sever was also changed from a male to a female character. Despite re-writing the entire script, Lenkov was not credited in the final film, and McElroy ended up getting only writing credit, despite very little similarities between his original script and Lenkov's re-write.

On November 12, 1999, The Honolulu Advertiser announced Chris Lee and Franchise Pictures would produce Ballistic: Ecks vs. Sever, and that Kaos would direct the film. On July 26, 2001, Entertainment Weekly revealed Liu and Banderas were in discussions about starring in the film, as well as two descriptions of the film's premise: "two competing assassins who unite against a common foe" and "Bad Boys meets  The Professional".

Principal photography was scheduled to begin in Bangkok on November 5, 2001. However, Lee changed the filming location to Hawaii, before ultimately settling on Vancouver, due to lower production costs and superior tax incentives. During the filming of Ballistic, Lee advocated in various ways for more government funding for Hawaii's film industry; for example, by appearing at the event Hawaii's Film Industry: Global Impact, Global Challenges, which was held at the Signature Dole Cannery Theatres on February 26, 2002.

Reception

Critical response
 As of 2022, among the films that hold, or have held, a 0% rating, Ballistic has the most reviews, being to date the only film with such a rating to have over 100 reviews. In March 2007, Rotten Tomatoes ranked the film number 1 on its "The Worst of the Worst" movie list, noting it as "the worst-reviewed movie in our site's history". 

Roger Ebert gave the film half a star out of four, and later listed it on the list of his most hated movies. He said of the film: "Ballistic: Ecks vs. Sever is an ungainly mess, submerged in mayhem, occasionally surfacing for cliches, overloaded with special effects and explosions, light on continuity, sanity and coherence. There is nothing wrong with the title Ballistic: Ecks vs. Sever that renaming it Ballistic would not have solved. Strange that they would choose such an ungainly title when, in fact, the movie is not about Ecks versus Sever but about Ecks and Sever working together against a common enemy – although Ecks, Sever and the audience take a long time to figure that out."

Lucy Liu was nominated for the 2002 Stinkers Bad Movie Awards Worst Actress Award, but lost to Madonna for her performance in Swept Away.

Box office
In its opening weekend, the film grossed $7 million in 2,705 theaters for an average of $2,591 per theater, ranking number 4 at the U.S. box office. The film ultimately earned $14.3 million in the U.S. and $5.6 million internationally for a total of $19.9 million against a $70 million production budget.

Soundtrack

The soundtrack includes these tracks:
 "Main Title"
 "The Name of the Game"
 "Smartbomb" [Plump Dj's Remix]
 "Heaven Scent" [Original Mix]
 "The Flow"
 "I Think of You" [Screamer Remix]
 "Hell Above Water"
 "Go"
 "Bloodlock"
 "I Need Love"
 "The Aquarium"
 "Time"
 "Anytime"

Video games

A Game Boy Advance first-person shooter, Ecks vs. Sever, was released in 2001, ten months before the film premiered. Unlike the film, the game received very positive reviews, and a score of 9/10 on IGN. The game was considered an impressive technological feat on the Game Boy Advance. A sequel game, Ballistic: Ecks vs. Sever, was released six days before the film's premiere and is based on its final cut that was released to theaters.

See also
 List of American films of 2002
 List of films considered the worst
 List of films with a 0% rating on Rotten Tomatoes

References

External links
 
 
 
 

2002 films
2002 action thriller films
2000s spy thriller films
American action thriller films
American spy thriller films
Canadian action thriller films
English-language Canadian films
English-language German films
Films produced by Elie Samaha
Films scored by Don Davis (composer)
Films set in Vancouver
Films shot in Vancouver
Franchise Pictures films
German action thriller films
Girls with guns films
Warner Bros. films
2000s English-language films
Films directed by Wych Kaosayananda
2000s American films
2000s Canadian films
2000s German films